Bosque de Pómac Historic Sanctuary is a protected area in Peru located in the region of Lambayeque. This area preserves part of the Tumbes-Piura dry forests and several pyramids built by Pre-Columbian cultures.

Geography 
Bosque de Pómac is located in the district of Pitipo, Ferreñafe Province, in the northern Peruvian region of Lambayeque. This area is in a coastal plain, part of the Pacific coast tropical desert, and also in the middle valley of the La Leche river.

Ecology 
The area is densely covered by a tropical dry forest ecosystem, dominated by trees of the genus Prosopis. Birds seen in the area include: the Peruvian thick-knee, the burrowing owl, the Amazilia hummingbird, etc.

Archaeology 
There are 36 Pre-Columbian pyramids inside the area, which is an important source of archaeological discoveries, especially from the Sican culture.

References

See also 
Batán Grande
 Iperu, tourist information and assistance
 Tourism in Peru
 Natural and Cultural Peruvian Heritage
 Sican culture

National Reservations of Peru
Geography of Lambayeque Region
Protected areas established in 2001
2001 establishments in Peru